Professor Richard Kiprono Mibey (born 12 December 1951) is a Kenyan academic, research scientist and university administrator. Mibey served as the Vice-Chancellor of Moi University, the second university to be established in Kenya between 2006 and 2016. He is a Professor of Mycology with over 35 years teaching and scholarly experience. He has extensive knowledge and experience in the higher education system having grown from a graduate assistant, research assistant, lecturer, senior lecturer, associate professor, professor, department chairman, dean, campus principal as well as deputy vice-chancellor.

Early life and education
Mibey was born in Nyambugo, Sigor North Location in the then Bomet District, Kenya. He was educated in Sugumerga Primary School and Kericho High School. He then proceeded to Warren Wilson College, Swannanoa, N.C, USA for a BA, -Biology (1972–1976) and then Appalachian State University, Boone, N.C. USA for a MSc Biology (1976–1978). In addition, he pursued an MSc in Plant Pathology at Oklahoma State University, Stillwater (1978–1981) and a D.Ed. in Agricultural Education and Extension (Speciality in Plant Pathology) at the same University (1981–1984).

He returned to Kenya and obtained a PhD in Mycology from University of Nairobi in 1996

Career
Prof Mibey worked as a Graduate Assistant, Department of Biology, Appalachian State University, Boone, N.C., USA (1977–1978), Graduate Assistant, Department of Plant Pathology, Oklahoma State University, Oklahoma, USA (1978–1983), Research Assistant, USDA Laboratory, Stillwater, Oklahoma, USA (1984–1985), lecturer, Department of Botany, University of Nairobi (1986–1989), Senior Lecturer, Department of Botany University of Nairobi (1989–1996), Associate professor of Botany (Mycology) (1997–2001) and Professor of Mycology ( Botany Dept. Univ. of Nairobi) (2002).

He has a rich administrative experience. From 1998 to 2002, he was the chairman, Department of Botany, University of Nairobi. He also served as Dean, Faculty of Science University of Nairobi (2000–2002), Principal, Chiromo campus, University of Nairobi(2002– Feb. 2004) as well as Deputy Vice-Chancellor, Administration and Finance, Maseno University (Feb. 2004 to Sept. 2006)

In September 2006, Prof Mibey was appointed the Vice-Chancellor of Moi University.

Scholarly work
Among other contributions to science, he has discovered more than 120 species of fungi, made major input to the discovery of environmentally friendly fungi for bio-control of the obnoxious water hyacinth weed in Lake Victoria has contributed to the preservation of rare and highly specialised micro-fungi of Kenyan plants.

He is also a world authority on Fungal Taxonomy and Biodiversity Conservation. He has received a number of fellowships: DAAD Senior research Fellow; Darwin Fellow in April 1994 – April 1995, UNESCO Fellowship

He is a member of the British Mycological Society, Committee on biodiversity and Conservation, International Association for Plant Taxonomy and World Innovation Foundation.

He has published over 50 publications and conference papers.

Personal life

Richard Mibey is married with two children.

Publications

Proximate Composition, Amino Acids and Vitamins Profile of Pleurotus citrinopileatus Singer: An Indigenous Mushroom in Kenya. Fredrick Musieba, Sheila Okoth, Richard K. Mibey, Stella Wanjiku and Knight Moraa. 2013 American Journal of Food Technology

Gough, F.J.; L.L. Singleton; T.S. Lee, and R.K. Mibey. 1981. Tan spot development in wheat cultivar Triumph 64 grown under three tillage systems. Phytopathology 71: 220.

Mibey, R.K. 1988. A new observation of the fungus Physarum cinereaum on the lawn grassPennisetum clandestinum in Kenya. K.J. .sc. & Tech. (B), 7:47–48.

Mibey, R.K. & N.C. Otieno. 1988. "Sooty mould" disease of citrus in Kenya caused by Capnodium citri. K.J. Sc. & Tech. (B). 9: 115–117. 

Mibey, R.K. 1988. Entomosporium fruit and leaf spot disease of loquat in Kenya K. J. Sc. & Tech. (B). 9:73–78.

Otieno, N.C. & R.K. Mibey. 1988. Leaf blight disease of strawberries in Kenya caused byDendrophoma obscurans. K.J. Sc. & Tech. (B). 9:111–114.

Karanja, T.W.; A.W. Mwang’ombe & R.K. Mibey. 1994. The effect of media and light regimes on cultural and morphological characteristics and sporulation on Phaeoisariopsis griseola Deight . E. Afric. For. J. 59: 241–251.

Isanda, G.O.; A.W. Mwang’ombe & R.K. Mibey 1994. Levels of seed-borne Colletorichum lindemuthianum on common bean cv. Rose Coco-Glp-2 from small scale farmers in Kenya. Afric. Crop Sci. Conf. Proc. 1: 260–262.

Mibey, R.K. & D.L. Hawksworth. 1995. Diporothecaceae, a new family of ascomycetes and the Term "Hyphopodium". Systema Ascomycetum 14: 25–31.

Mibey, R.K. & D.L. Hawksworth. 1996. Glifford Gerald Hansford. Trop. Pl. Path. 7(2): 20–23.

Mibey, R.K. 1996. Taxonomic studies of the fungal families Meliolaceae, Asterinaceae and their allies from Mau forest in western Kenya. PhD thesis, University of Nairobi.

Harharan, G.N.; R.K Mibey & D.L. Hawksworth. 1996. A new species of Lichenopelthella on Porina in India. Lichenologist 28: 294–296.

Mibey, R.K.; J.O. Kokwaro & D.M. Mukunya. 1996a. A new species and four new records of Asterina from Kenya. Nova Hedwigia 62: 147–150.

Mibey, R.K.; J.O. Kokwaro & D.M. Mukunya. 1996b. Four new species and some new records of Meliolaceous fungi from Kenya. Mycotaxon 57: 87–95.

Mibey, R.K. 1996. African Mycological Association. Mycologist 9: 31–32.

Mibey, R.K. & D.L. Hawksworth. 1997. Meliolaceae and Asterinaceae of the Shimba Hills, Kenya. Mycol. Papers 174: 1–108.

Mibey, R.K. 1997. Sooty mould fungi. In Soft scale Insects: Their biology, Natural enemies and Control. Yair Ben-Dov & C.J. Hodgson. World Crop Pests, 7A. Elsevier. Amsterdam. Pp 275–20.

Mibey, R.K. & J.O. Kokwaro 1998.  Meliola icacinacearum and M. kerichoensis, spp. Nov. from Kenya. Mycol. Res. 102(11):1418–1420

Mibey, R.K. & P.F. Cannon.  1999.  Biotrophic fungi from Kenya.  Ten new species and some new records of Meliolaceae.  Cryptogamie, Mycol. 20(4): 249–282.

Mibey, R.K. & J.O. Kokwaro. 1999.  Two new species of Meliola from Kenya. Fungal Diversity2:153–157.

Bii, C., G.M. Siboe & R.K. Mibey. 2000.  Plant essential oils with promising antifungal activity.  E. Afric. Med. J. 77(6):319–322.

Cannon, P.F., R.K. Mibey & G.M. Siboe. 2001.  Microfungi and Conservation Agenda in Kenya.  In Moore, D. Nauta, M.M.S. Evans & M. Rotherroe (eds).  Fungal Conservation.  Cambridge University Press, Cambridge, UK.

Mibey R. K. 2006 . A Status Review of Kenya's Microbial Resources and their contribution to Kenya's National Development – Environment and Development in Kenya: Biodiversity – A Public Lecture Series. Kenya National Academy of Sciences.

P. M. Wachira, J. W. Kimenju, S. A. Okoth and R. K. Mibey, 2009. Stimulation of nematode – destroying fungi by organic amendments applied in management of plant parasitic nematode. Asian Journal Plant Sciences. 8: (2) 153 – 159. 

P. Wachira, R. Mibey, S. Okoth, J. Kimenju and J. Kiarie, 2009. Diversity of nematode destroying fungi in Taita Taveta, Kenya. Fungal Ecology 2: (2) 60 – 65.

Tuigong D. R., R. K. Mibey, and Ding Xin. 2609.  Prediction of Fabric Hand Stiffners by use of Fabric surface and mechanical properties.  In Emerging Trends in Production, Processing and Utilisation of Natural Fibres.  Mumbai India. pp. 424–436.

Mibey R. K., D. R. Tuigong and B. N. A. Makumba, 2009.  Fabric/Yarn Dyeing using Dyes extracted from locally available mushroom species.  pp. 460–467.

Musieba F, Okoth S, Mibey R., K., Wanjiku S. and Moraa K.2013.Proximate composition, Amino Acids and Vitamins Profile of Pleurotus citrinopileatus Singer:An Indigenous Mushroom in Kenya.American Journal of Food Technology

References
 http://www.mu.ac.ke/index.php/list-of-professors/84-administration/124-vice-chancellor-s-profile
 https://www.yumpu.com/en/document/view/16959843/curriculum-vitae-prof-richard-kiprono-mibey-university-of-nairobi

External links
Vice Chancellor's Office, Moi University

Living people
Kenyan academic administrators
Kenyan mycologists
People associated with Moi University
1951 births
Vice-chancellors of universities in Kenya